The Monts du Lyonnais are a range of low-altitude mountains and eastern foothills of the Massif Central located in the Loire and Rhône departments in France.

Geography
The monts du Lyonnais' highest summit is the crêt Malherbe (946 m).

The Janon river running east from Terrenoire (now part of Saint-Étienne) and then the Gier continuing east from Saint-Chamond to meet the Rhone at Givors create a valley in the coal basin that separates Mont Pilat from the Monts du Lyonnais.

References
Citations

Sources

Landforms of Loire (department)
Massif Central
Landforms of Rhône (department)
Mountain ranges of Auvergne-Rhône-Alpes